Middle Branch Little Black Creek flows into Little Black Creek.

References 

Rivers of New York (state)
Rivers of Herkimer County, New York